The Four Worlds ( Olamot, singular: Olam עולם), sometimes counted with a prior stage to make Five Worlds, are the comprehensive categories of spiritual realms in Kabbalah in the descending chain of Existence.
The concept of "Worlds" denotes the emanation of creative lifeforce from the Ein Sof Divine Infinite, through progressive, innumerable tzimtzumim (concealments/veilings/condensations). As particular sefirot dominate in each realm, so the primordial fifth World, Adam Kadmon, is often excluded for its transcendence, and the four subsequent Worlds are usually referred to. Their names are read out from Isaiah 43:7, "Every one that is called by My name and for My glory, I have created, I have formed, even I have made" each elucidating the names Atziluth ("Emanation/Close"),  Beriah ("Creation"), Yetzirah ("Formation"), and Asiyah ("Action"). Below Asiyah, the lowest spiritual World, is Asiyah-Gashmi ("Physical Asiyah"), our Physical Universe, which enclothes its last two sefirot “emanations” (Yesod and Malkuth). Collectively, the Four Worlds are also referred to as ABiYA, after their initial letters. As well as the functional role each World has in the process of Creation, they also embody dimensions of consciousness within human experience.

Enumeration

The Worlds are formed by the Ohr Mimalei Kol Olmin, literally "Fills all Words", which is the Divine creative light that represents the concept of Divine immanence. The 10 sefirot attributes and their associated 12 partzufim "shine" in each world, as do more specific Divine manifestations. In Lurianic Kabbalah, the partzufim dynamically interact with each other, and sublime "levels" are enclothed within lower existences, representing a sort-of concealed soul. Nonetheless, in each World, particular sefirot and partzufim predominate. The Five Worlds are, in descending order:
Adam Kadmon (אָדָם קַדְמוֹן) meaning Primordial Man. The anthropomorphic metaphor "Adam" denotes the Yosher ("Upright") arrangement of the sefirot as the tree of life, which is then personified in the form of Man, though not yet manifest. "Kadmon" signifies "primary of all primaries", the first pristine emanation, still united with the Ein Sof. Adam Kadmon is the realm of "Keter Elyon" (Supernal Crown of Will), "the lucid and luminous light" (Tzachtzachot), "the pure lucid sefirot which are concealed and hidden" in potential. In regards to the future emergence of Creation, it represents Divine light with no vessels, the manifestation of the specific Divine plan for Existence, within Creation (after the Tzimtzum in Lurianic Kabbalah). In Lurianism, the lights from Adam Kadmon precipitate Tohu and Tikun. As Keter is elevated above the sefirot, so Adam Kadmon is supreme above the Worlds, and therefore it is generally not included whenever the Worlds are referred to.
Atziluth (אֲצִילוּת), meaning World of Emanation, also called Atzilus. On this level the light of the Ein Sof radiates, but is still united with its source. This supernal revelation therefore precludes the souls and Divine emanations in Atziluth from sensing or perceiving their own existence. In Atziluth, the 10 sefirot emerge in revelation, with Chochma (Wisdom) dominating, all is nullification of essence (Bittul HaEtzem) to Divinity, not considered created and separate. In the context of Atziluth, the last sefirah Malkuth (Kingdom) represents the "Divine speech" of Genesis 1 through which God created the Universe, and so, it is through this Malkuth that the lower Worlds are sustained.
Beri'ah (בְּרִיאָה or alternatively בְּרִיָּה), meaning World of Creation. On this level is the first concept of creatio ex nihilo (Yesh miAyin), however without yet shape or form, as the creations of Beriah sense their own existence, though in nullification of being (Bittul HaMetzius) to Divinity. Beriah is the realm of the "Divine Throne", denoting the sefirot configuration of Atziluth descending into Beriah like a King on a Throne. The sefirah Binah (Understanding) predominates, representing Divine intellect.
Yetzirah (יְצִירָה), meaning World of Formation. On this level, created beings assume shape and form. The emotional sefirot, Chesed through Yesod, predominate. The souls and angels within Yetzirah worship through Divine emotion and striving, as they sense their distance from the Understanding of Beriah. This ascent and descent channels the Divine vitality down through the Worlds, furthering the Divine purpose. Therefore, in Yetzirah are the main angels, such as Seraphim, denoting their burning consummation in Divine emotion. 
Asiyah (עֲשִׂיָּה), meaning World of Action. On this level, Creation is complete, differentiated and particular, as by this point the Divine vitality has undergone much concealment and diminution. However, it is still on a spiritual level. The angels of Asiyah function on the active level, as the sefirah Malkuth (fulfilment in Kingship) predominates. Below spiritual Asiyah is Asiyah Gashmi (עֲשִׂיָה גַשׁמִי, "Physical Asiyah"), the final, lowest realm of existence, our material Universe with all its creations. Much like how the sefirah Malkuth within Atziluth is the conduit by which the later worlds emanate, the final sefirot of Asiyah are the point by which the physical universe derives.

Meaning

The Four Worlds are spiritual, heavenly realms in a descending chain, although the lowest world of Assiah has both a spiritual and a physical aspect. The physical level of Assiah is our physical finite realm, including the cosmological Universe studied by science. Consequently, as Kabbalah becomes more of a metaphysical study, the terms "higher" and "lower" are used as metaphors for being closer or further from Divine consciousness, revelation, and emanance.
The 16th-century systemisation of Kabbalah by Moshe Cordovero brought the preceding interpretations and schools into their first complete rational synthesis. Subsequent doctrines of Kabbalah from Isaac Luria, describe an initial Tzimtzum (withdrawal of the universal Divine consciousness that preceded Creation) to "allow room" for created beings on lower levels of consciousness. Lower levels of consciousness require the self-perception of independent existence, by the created beings on each level, to prevent their loss of identity before the magnificence of God. This illusion increases with more force in each subsequent descending realm. The number of graduations between the Infinite and the finite, is likewise infinite, and arises from innumerable, progressively strong concealments of the Divine light. Nonetheless, the four worlds represent fundamental categories of Divine consciousness from each other, which delineates their four descriptions. Consequently, each world also psychologically represents a spiritual rung of ascent in human consciousness, as it approaches the Divine.
Kabbalah distinguishes between two types of Divine light that emanate through the 10 sefirot (Divine emanations) from the Infinite (Ein Sof), to create or affect reality. There is a continual flow of a "lower" light, the Mimalei Kol Olmin, the light of eminence that "fills all worlds" is the creating force in each descending world, that itself continually brings everything in that level of existence into being from nothing. It is this light that undergoes the various divine concealments and contractions as it descends downward to create the next level, and adapts itself to the capacity of each created being on each level. A transcendent higher light Sovev Kol Olmin, the light that "surrounds all worlds" would be the manifestation on a particular level of a higher light which above the capacity of that realm to contain. This is ultimately rooted in the infinite light ("Ohr Ein Sof") that preceded Creation, the Tzimtzum and the Sephirot, rather than the source of the immanent light in the "Kav" (first emanation of creation after the Tzimtzum), in the teachings of Isaac Luria. Consequently, all the worlds are dependent for their continual existence on the flow of Divinity they constantly receive from the Divine Will to create them. Creation is continuous. The faculty of Divine Will is represented in the sefirot (10 Divine emanations) by the first, supra-conscious Sephirah of "Keter"-Crown, that transcends the lower 9 Sephirot of conscious intellect and emotion. Once the Divine Will is manifest, then it actualises Creation through Divine Intellect, and "subsequently" Divine Emotion, until it results in action. The reference to temporal cause and effect is itself a metaphor. The psychology of man also reflects the "Divine psychology" of the sefirot, as "Man is created in the image of God" (Genesis 1:27). In man the activation of willpower through intellect and emotion until deed, requires time and subsequent cause and effect. In the Divine Sephirot and their activation of Creation, this does not apply, as limitations only apply to Creation.
The Book of Job states that "from my flesh I see God". In Kabbalah and Hasidism this is understood to refer to the correspondence between the "Divine psychology" of the Four Worlds and the Sephirot, with human psychology and the Sephirot in the soul of man. From understanding the Kabbalistic description of the human soul, we can grasp the meaning of the Divine scheme. Ultimately, this is seen as the reason that God chose to emanate His Divinity through the 10 Sephirot, and chose to create the corresponding chain of four Worlds (called the "Seder hishtalshelus"-"order of development"). He could have chosen to bridge the infinite gap between the Ein Sof and our World by a leap of Divine decree. Instead the Sephirot and Four Worlds allow man to understand Divinity through Divine manifestation, by understanding himself. The verse in Genesis of this correspondence also describes the feminine half of Creation: (Genesis 1:27) "So God created man in His own image, in the image of God created He him, male and female created He them". Consequently, some of the sefirot are feminine, and the Shechina (immanent Divine presence) is seen as feminine. It is the intimate relationship between the Divine scheme of four World and man, that allows man's ascent more easily to Divine consciousness (see Dveikus).

Correspondences

See also
Anthropomorphism in Kabbalah
Hopi mythology#Four Worlds
Masseket Azilut
Yehuda Ashlag
Mind–body problem
Popper's three worlds

References

External links
 The Worlds: The Stages of the Creative Process from God's Infinite Light to Our Physical World - Describes the many levels and Partzufim between Adam Kadmon and Atzilut, as well as prior stages, and then the subsequent Four Worlds
 4/Four Worlds:  Atziluth, Briah, Yetzirah, Assiah

 
Kabbalah
Kabbalistic words and phrases